Cheyra Marie Angela Bell (born 24 September 1988) is a Bermudian professional footballer who plays as a forward.

Personal life
Bell studied at Howard University and is a sister of Tahj Bell, who played once for Bermuda.

See also
List of Bermuda women's international footballers

References

External links 
 

1988 births
Living people
Women's association football forwards
Bermudian women's footballers
Bermuda women's international footballers
Bermudian expatriate sportspeople in the United States
Howard Bison women's soccer players